Penny Lin (born June 7, 1978) is a Taiwanese actress.

Filmography

Television series

Movies

References

External links
 
 

1978 births
21st-century Taiwanese actresses
Living people